The Assurance Companies Act of 1909 was a piece of legislation in the United Kingdom regulating motor vehicle insurance. It became the catalyst for the Road Traffic Act of 1930.

Transport policy in the United Kingdom
United Kingdom Acts of Parliament 1909
Insurance in the United Kingdom
1909 in transport
Vehicle insurance